Hugh Desmond "Hughie" Teape (born 26 December 1963 in Hackney) is a male retired English athlete who specialised in the high hurdles.

Athletics career
He represented Great Britain at the 1992 Summer Olympics in Barcelona, finishing eighth in the final. He represented England in the 110 metres hurdles event, at the 1990 Commonwealth Games in Auckland, New Zealand.

His personal bests are 13.44 seconds in the 110 metres hurdles (+0.4 m/s, Sheffield 1992) and 7.69 seconds in the 60 metres hurdles (Glasgow 1992).

International competitions

References

All-Athletics profile

1963 births
Living people
English male hurdlers
People from the London Borough of Hackney
Athletes (track and field) at the 1990 Commonwealth Games
Athletes (track and field) at the 1992 Summer Olympics
Olympic athletes of Great Britain
Commonwealth Games competitors for England